Hugh M. Gallagher (15 October 1891 – December 1920) was a Scottish football left half who played in the Scottish League for Aberdeen.

Personal life 
Gallagher served with the Football Battalion and the Gordon Highlanders during the First World War.

Honours 
Aberdeen

 Robertson Cup: 1915–16

Career statistics

References 

Scottish footballers
Linlithgow Rose F.C. players
British Army personnel of World War I
Middlesex Regiment soldiers
Southern Football League players
Scottish Football League players
Association football wing halves
Gordon Highlanders soldiers
1920 deaths
Partick Thistle F.C. players
Bristol Rovers F.C. players
Aberdeen F.C. players
1891 births
Footballers from Glasgow
Date of death unknown